The Madikwe Game Reserve is a protected area in South Africa, part of the latest park developments in the country. Named after the Madikwe or Marico River, on whose basin it is located, it was opened in 1991 and comprises 750 km² of bushland north of the small town Groot-Marico up to the Botswana border.

Description
Madikwe Game Reserve lies 90 km north of Zeerust on what used to be farm land, but owing to the poor soil type, farming was not that successful. After extensive research, the South African Government found that this land would best be utilised as a provincial park, to economically uplift this otherwise rather poor area.

The process of reintroducing wildlife to the area began in 1992 under the codename Operation Phoenix which relocated entire breeding herds of elephants, Cape buffaloes, south-central black rhinos and southern white rhinos along with various species of antelopes. Following Operation Phoenix, Madikwe has also successfully reintroduce rarer predatory species such as lions, cheetahs, spotted hyenas and Cape wild dogs bringing the total large mammal population of the reserve to over 10 000. There are currently more than 60 species of mammal in the park.

The reserve has recently opened itself up to private farms outside the main reserve. Private users need to abide by parks board rules, animals can roam over any land, but there are restrictions as to where private vehicles can drive. There are 30 lodges on the property, and six lodges in the private farms outside the main reserve. Some of the commercial lodges include Rhulani Safari Lodge, Jaci's Lodges, Tau Game Lodge, Etali Safari Lodge, Impodimo Game Lodge and an eco-lodge, Mosetlha Bush Camp. Madikwe has started community lodges, which the local villages own and run. All profits are then used to uplift the communities.

It is currently the fifth largest game reserve in South Africa and yet not widely known. The park is now 680 km² by itself, and 750 km², including the now incorporated privately owned land. The terrain is mainly open grasslands and bushveld plains, interspersed with rocky outcrops and single mountains. Madikwe has been regarded as one of the better conservation areas in Africa, offering all the major species, including lion, leopards, elephants, Cape buffaloes, both white and black rhinos along with almost all the plains antelope species.

A special feature of Madikwe lies in its unique location, a transition zone on the edges of the Kalahari, where a number of rare species occur naturally, and the bushveld. The climate is generally mild to hot, but winter nights can be cold. Over 350 species of birds have been recorded at Madikwe. The reserve is relatively close to Pilanesberg Game Reserve and there is a long-term plan to develop a corridor between the two parks.

Climate and Weather
Madikwe forms part of a semi-arid region on the edge of the Kalahari desert. In this region the climate can be broken into the rainy season (October – April) and the dry season (May – September). Summers overlap with the rainy season. Temperatures are high (32 °C / 90 °F) with cooling thunderstorms common in the late afternoon, evenings are mild (18 °C / 64 °F). Winters here are dry, with mild days (21 °C / 70 °F) and chilly nights (3 °C / 37 °F). Game viewing is good at all times of the year though most animals tend to congregate around available water sources during the winter.

Transportation Options
Federal Air operates charter flights to OR Tambo International Airport from the airstrips in both the north and south of Madikwe. The flight takes about 55 minutes. Alternatively, the drive from Johannesburg is about 5 hours.

References

External links
 Madikwe Game Reserve official website

North West Provincial Parks